Joffrey Michel (born 4 March 1987 in Arles) is a French rugby union player. His position is fullback or wing and he currently plays for Montpellier in the Top 14.

Honours
USA Perpignan
Top 14 (2009)

References

1987 births
Living people
French rugby union players
People from Arles
USA Perpignan players
Rugby union fullbacks
Rugby union wings
Sportspeople from Bouches-du-Rhône